The Orenco D was an American biplane fighter aircraft, designed by Orenco and built by Curtiss Aeroplane and Motor Company.  It was the first fighter type of completely indigenous design (as opposed to foreign types or American-built versions of foreign types) to enter US military service.

Development
The D prototype was offered to the US Army Air Service at the end of 1918. It was a two-bay biplane of all-wood construction, covered with fabric. It was powered by a  Hispano-Suiza engine. The pilot of the first flight test, Clarence B. Coombs, gave it a positive evaluation: "This aircraft performs better than the Sopwith Camel and Snipe, the Thomas-Morse, the Nieuport and Morane Parasol, the Spad and S.V.A." The military ordered 50 production aircraft, but put the production order up for bidding. Curtiss Aircraft entered the lowest bid and built the fighter, modifying it slightly with a wider wingspan and redesigned ailerons. The first Curtiss Orenco D flew on 26 August 1921.

Variants
Orenco D  Prototype, four built

Curtiss Orenco D  Production aircraft, 50 built

Orenco D-2  Prototype based on Curtiss Orenco D. three built, under military designation PW-3.

Operators

United States Army Air Service

Specifications
Data from: Flight: The Aircraft Engineer & Airships, "Some 'Orenco' (U.S.A) Aeroplanes", 1 April 1920, pp. 363–366.

Curtiss Orenco D

Data quoted here may differ in some respects from that quoted by Angelucci.

General characteristics

crew: one
length: 
Height: 
Upper Wing
Span: 
Area: 
Lower wing
Span: 
Area: 
Total wing area (including ailerons): 
Wing gap: 
Wing stagger: 
Empty weight: 
Gross weight: 
Powerplant: one × Wright-Hispano H 
Fuel Capacity:

Performance

Speed
At sea level: 
At : 
Time to climb
To : 4 min 20 s
To : 8 min 54 s
To : 16 min 45 s
Service ceiling: 
Range at full speed:

Armament

2 ×  machine guns

Orenco D2

General characteristics

crew: one
length: 
Height: 
Upper Wing
Span: 
Area: 
Lower wing
Span: 
Area: 
Total wing area (including ailerons): 
Wing gap: 
Wing stagger: 
Empty weight: 
Gross weight: 
Powerplant: one × Wright-Hispano H 
Fuel Capacity:

Performance

Speed
At sea level: 
At : 
Time to climb
To : 4 min
To : 8 min 30 s
To : 13 min 50 s
Range at full speed:

References

Bibliography
 

1910s United States fighter aircraft
Curtiss aircraft
D
Single-engined tractor aircraft
Biplanes
Aircraft first flown in 1919